Andarta was a Celtic goddess worshiped in southern Gaul. Inscriptions invoking her name have been found among the Vocontii in Southern France, and in Bern, Switzerland.

Name 
The Gaulish theonym Andarta is traditionally interpreted as meaning 'Great Bear', perhaps 'powerful bear' or Ursa Major, formed with an intensifying suffix and- attached to a feminine form of artos ('bear'). Andarta might thus have been a counterpart or an alternative name of the Celtic bear goddess, Artio.

According to linguist Blanca María Prósper, however, "this idea is uncompelling because the semantics lack good parallels and the inner syntax of the compound is utterly problematic." In her view, the name should be translated as 'Well-fixed, Staying-firm', formed with a prefix *h₂ndʰi- (or *h₁ndo-) attached to a participle *-h₂-rtó ('fixed, composed, built'; cf. Sanskrit ṛta 'cosmic law, order', Greek artús 'arrangement', Latin artus 'joint').

References
Notes

Bibliography

 
 
 

Gaulish goddesses
Bear deities